The siege of Dublin may refer to various sieges of the Irish capital including:

 Siege of Dublin (1171), during the Norman invasion of Ireland
 Siege of Dublin (1534), during the Kildare Rebellion
 Siege of Dublin (1649), during the War of the Three Kingdoms